Kenneth's white-toothed rat (Berylmys mackenziei) is a species of rodent in the family Muridae.
It is found in China, India, Myanmar, and Vietnam.

References

Further reading 

Berylmys
Rats of Asia
Rodents of Southeast Asia
Rodents of China
Rodents of India
Mammals described in 1916
Taxa named by Oldfield Thomas
Taxonomy articles created by Polbot